Liu Wei (born March 11, 1995) is a Chinese cyclist, who last rode for . He has participated in the 2014 Tour of Qinghai Lake, Tour of Hainan and Tour of Taihu Lake.

References

External links
Cyclingdatabase.com Results

1967 births
Living people
Chinese male cyclists
20th-century Chinese people
21st-century Chinese people